This is a list of the flags of the Mughal Empire, which had a number of imperial flags and standards. The principal imperial standard of the Mughals was known as the alam . It was primarily moss green. It displayed a lion and sun facing the hoist of the flag. The Mughals traced their use of the alam back to Timur.
The imperial standard was displayed to the right of the throne and also at the entrance of the Emperor's encampment and in front of the emperor during military marches.

History 
According to the Ain-i-Akbari, during Akbar's reign, whenever the emperor rode out, not less than five alams were carried along with the qur (a collection of flags and other insignia) wrapped up in scarlet cloth bags. They were unfurled on the days of festivity, and in battle.

Edward Terry, chaplain to Sir Thomas Roe, who came during the reign of Jahangir, described in his Voyage to East-India (1655) that the royal standard, made of silk, featuring the Nad-e-Ali represented by a crouching lion shadowing part of the body of the sun (known as Aftab) inscribed on it, was carried on an elephant whenever the emperor travelled.

A painting by Payag in a manuscript of the Padshahnama, a chronicle on Shah Jahan's reign, preserved in the Royal Library, Windsor Castle depicted the Mughal standards as the scarlet pennons with green borders with a passant lion and rising sun behind it. Another painting in the same manuscript depicted the Mughal standards having green fields with a couchant lion and rising sun behind it. In the image to the left, note the flag at the bottom with the standing lion and the sun in a red interior color. Notice also the flag in the upper part of the picture with green interior and yellow linings.

Seals

Subjects and vassals of the Mughal Empire

See also
 Mughal Empire
 Peacock Throne
 List of Indian flags
 Imperial Standards of Iran
 Flags of the Ottoman Empire

References

Further reading
 Koch, Ebba (2001). Mughal Art and Imperial Ideology: Collected Essays, New Delhi: Oxford University Press.

External links

 An engraving of the Mughal imperial standard from Foster, William (ed.) The embassy of Sir Thomas Roe to the court of the Great Mogul, 1615–1619, as narrated in his journal and correspondence London: Haklyut Society, 1899 in Internet Archive website

Government of the Mughal Empire
Obsolete national flags
Flags of India
Flags displaying animals